Arthraerua is a genus of flowering plants belonging to the family Amaranthaceae.

Its native range is Namibia.

Species:

Arthraerua leubnitziae

References

Amaranthaceae
Amaranthaceae genera